Oculogryphus, is an Asian genus of firefly beetles: it has been placed in the Ototretinae or may be considered incertae sedis. The genus contains 4 species. The type species O. fulvus was discovered from Vietnam.

Description
Antennae filiform. Large compound eyes are deeply emarginated posteriorly. There are eight abdominal ventrites. No photogenic organs. Females of this genus can fluoresce with a blue-green light whole body. Species rely on photic cues for purposes of mating. Body shape of male is elongate
oval.

Species
 Oculogryphus bicolor Jeng, Branham & Engel, 2011 - Vietnam
 Oculogryphus chenghoiyanae Yiu & Jeng, 2018 - Hong Kong
 Oculogryphus fulvus Jeng, 2007 - Vietnam
 Oculogryphus shuensis Jeng & Engel, 2014 - China

References

External links

Lampyridae
Lampyridae genera
Taxa named by Michael S. Engel